Flag Officer Sea Training (FOST) may refer to:
 Flag Officer Sea Training (India)
 Flag Officer Sea Training (Pakistan)
 Commander Fleet Operational Sea Training